Troglojapyx is a genus of diplurans in the family Japygidae.

Species
 Troglojapyx hauseri Pagés, 1980

References

Diplura